In mathematics, the barycentric subdivision is a standard way to subdivide a given simplex into smaller ones. Its extension on simplicial complexes is a canonical method to refine them. Therefore, the barycentric subdivision is an important tool in algebraic topology.

Motivation 
The barycentric subdivision is an operation on simplicial complexes. In algebraic topology it is sometimes useful to replace the original spaces with simplicial complexes via triangulations: The substitution allows to assign combinatorial invariants as the Euler characteristic to the spaces. One can ask if there is an analogous way to replace the continuous functions defined on the topological spaces by functions that are linear on the simplices and which are homotopic to the original maps (see also simplicial approximation). In general, such an assignment requires a refinement of the given complex, meaning, one replaces bigger simplices by a union of smaller simplices. A standard way to effectuate such  a refinement is the barycentric subdivision. Moreover, barycentric subdivision induces maps on homology groups and is helpful for computational concerns, see Excision and Mayer-Vietoris-sequence.

Definition

Subdivision of simplicial complexes 
Let  be a geometric simplicial complex. A complex  is said to be a subdivision of  if

These conditions imply that  and  equal as sets and as topological spaces, only the simplicial structure changes.

Barycentric subdivision of a simplex 
For a simplex  spanned by points , the barycenter is defined to be the point  . To define the subdivision, we will consider a simplex as a simplicial complex that contains only one simplex of maximal dimension, namely the simplex itself.  The barycentric subdivision of a simplex can be defined inductively by its dimension.

For points, i.e. simplices of dimension 0, the barycentric subdivision is defined as the point itself.

Suppose then for a simplex  of dimension  that its faces   of dimension  are already divided. Therefore, there exist simplices  covering .

One can generalize the subdivision for simplicial complexes whose simplices are not all contained in a single simplex of maximal dimension, i.e. simplicial complexes that do not correspond geometrically to one simplex. This can be done by effectuating the steps described above simultaneously for every simplex of maximal dimension. The induction will then be based on the -th skeleton of the simplicial complex. It allows effectuating the subdivision more than once.

Barycentric subdivision of a convex polytope

The operation of barycentric subdivision can be applied to any convex polytope of any dimension, producing another convex polytope of the same dimension. In this version of barycentric subdivision, it is not necessary for the polytope to form a simplicial complex: it can have faces that are not simplices. This is the dual operation to omnitruncation. The vertices of the barycentric subdivision correspond to the faces of all dimensions of the original polytope. Two vertices are adjacent in the barycentric subdivision when they correspond to two faces of different dimensions with the lower-dimensional face included in the higher-dimensional face. The facets of the barycentric subdivision are simplices, corresponding to the flags of the original polytope.

For instance, the barycentric subdivision of a cube, or of a regular octahedron, is the disdyakis dodecahedron. The degree-6, degree-4, and degree-8 vertices of the disdyakis dodecahedron correspond to the vertices, edges, and square facets of the cube, respectively.

Properties

Mesh 
Let   a simplex and define . One way to measure the mesh of a geometric, simplicial complex is to take the maximal diameter of the simplices contained in the complex.  Let  be an - dimensional simplex that comes from the covering of  obtained by the barycentric subdivision. Then, the following estimation holds:

. Therefore, by applying barycentric subdivision sufficiently often, the largest edge can be made as small as desired.

Homology 
For some statements in homology-theory one wishes to replace simplicial complexes by a subdivision. On the level of simplicial homology groups one requires a map from the homology-group of the original simplicial complex to the groups of the subdivided complex. Indeed it can be shown that for any subdivision  of a finite simplicial complex  there is a unique sequence of maps between the homology groups   such that for each  in  the maps fulfills  and such that the maps induces endomorphisms of chain complexes. Moreover, the induced map is an isomorphism: Subdivision does not change the homology of the complex.

To compute the singular homology groups of a topological space  one considers continuous functions  where  denotes the -dimensional-standard-simplex. In an analogous way as described for simplicial homology groups, barycentric subdivision can be interpreted as an endomorphism of singular chain complexes. This map also induces an automorphism of chain complexes.

Applications 
The barycentric subdivision can be applied on whole simplicial complexes as in the simplicial approximation theorem or it can be used to subdivide geometric simplices. Therefore it is crucial for statements in singular homology theory, see Mayer-Vietoris-sequence and excision.

Simplicial approximation 
Let ,  be abstract simplicial complexes above sets , . By affin-linear extension on the simplices,  induces a map between the geometric realizations of the complexes. Each point in a geometric complex lies in the inner of exactly one simplex, its support. Consider now a continuous map . If such an approximation exists, one can construct a homotopy  transforming  into  by defining it on each simplex; there, it always exists, because simplices are contractible.

The theorem plays an important role for certain statements in algebraic topology in order to reduce the behavior of continuous maps on those of simplicial maps, as for instance in Lefschetz's fixed-point theorem.

Lefschetz's fixed-point theorem 
The Lefschetz number is a useful tool to find out whether a continuous function admits fixed-points. A continuous map  induces homomorphisms  between its simplicial homology groups with coefficients in a field . These are linear maps between - vectorspaces, so their trace  can be determined and their alternating sum

The fixpoint theorem states that whenever ,  has a fixed-point. In the proof this is first shown only for simplicial maps and then generalized for any continuous functions via the approximation theorem.

Now, Brouwer's fixpoint theorem is a special case of this statement. Let  is an endomorphism of the unit-ball.

Mayer-Vietoris-Sequence 
The Mayer- Vietoris- Sequence is often used to compute singular homology groups and gives rise to inductive arguments in topology. The related statement can be formulated as follows:

Let  an open cover of the topological space  .

There is an exact sequence

 
 

where we consider singular homology groups,   are embeddings and  denotes the direct sum of abelian groups.

For the construction of singular homology groups one considers continuous maps defined on the standard simplex .

Excision 
Excision can be used to determine relative homology groups. It allows in certain cases to forget about subsets of topological spaces for their homology groups and therefore simplifies their computation:

Let  be a topological space and let  be subsets, where  is closed such that . Then the inclusion  induces an  isomorphism  for all 

Again, in singular homology, maps  may appear such that their image is not part of the subsets mentioned in the theorem. Analogously those can be understood as a sum of images of smaller simplices obtained by the barycentric subdivision.

References 

Algebraic topology
Geometric topology
Triangulation (geometry)
Simplicial homology